Events from the year 1923 in art.

Events
 March 20 – The Arts Club of Chicago hosts the opening of Pablo Picasso's first United States show, Original Drawings by Pablo Picasso.
 May 8 – Göteborgs Konsthall opens as the art gallery for the Gothenburg Exhibition.
 Publication of The Art Spirit by Robert Henri.
 English industrialist and collector Samuel Courtauld acquires the first painting by Paul Cézanne to be purchased for a British collection, Still life with Plaster Cupid (c.1894).
 Chaïm Soutine sells sixty of his paintings from a Paris showing to the American art collector Albert C. Barnes and begins his series of paintings of beef carcasses.
 A joint exhibition with his mother, Suzanne Valadon, at the Galerie Bernheim-Jeune in Paris brings the paintings of Maurice Utrillo to prominence.
 East London Group forms as an amateur art club in the East End of London.
 Freer Gallery of Art opens in Washington, D.C. as the first Smithsonian museum dedicated to the fine arts.
 Remington Art Memorial established in Ogdensburg, New York.
 Harwood Museum of Art established in Taos, New Mexico.
 Beaux Arts Gallery established in London by Frederick and Helen Lessore.

Awards
 Archibald Prize: W B McInnes – Portrait of a Lady

Works

 Max Beckmann – Dance in Baden-Baden
 Constantin Brâncuși – Bird in Space (sculpture; first version)
 Felice Casorati – Meriggio (Noon)
 Tamara de Lempicka – Les Deux amies
 Robert Delaunay – Portrait of Tristan Tzara
 Marcel Duchamp – The Bride Stripped Bare By Her Bachelors, Even (The Large Glass) (completed)
 Max Ernst – Pietà or Revolution by Night
 M. C. Escher – Dolphins (woodcut)
 George Grosz – Ecce Homo (portfolio of lithographs)
 Auguste Herbin – Bowls Players
 Marguerite Huré – Stained glass windows at Église Notre-Dame du Raincy
 Wassily Kandinsky – On White II
 Ernst Ludwig Kirchner – The Sleigh Ride
 Sir John Lavery – The Red Rose
 Sir Bertram Mackennal
 Phoebus Driving the Horses of the Sun (Australia House, London)
 Mother Courage (war memorial, Caledonian Club, London)
 Eton College War Memorial (male nude, now National Gallery of Victoria, Australia)
 Henri Matisse
 Odalisque with Raised Arms
 Window at Tangier
 Mikhail Nesterov – Girl by the Pool
 William Orpen – To the Unknown British Soldier in France (first finished state)
 Pablo Picasso
 The Pipes of Pan
 Paulo on a Donkey
 Man Ray – Object to Be Destroyed (destroyed 1957)
 Gerrit Rietveld – Red and Blue Chair (colours added in De Stijl style at about this date)
 Stanley Royle – Sheffield from Wincobank Wood
 Stanley Spencer – The Betrayal
 Lorado Taft – The Recording Angel (sculpture, Waupun, Wisconsin)
 Suzanne Valadon – Blue Room
 World War I Memorial (Berwick, Pennsylvania)
 Yokoyama Taikan – Metempsychosis (生々流転, Seisei ruten, "The Wheel of Life", Nihonga scroll painting)

Births
 January 16 – Keith Shackleton, English painter and television host (d. 2015)
 February 10 – Shirley Jaffe, American-born abstract painter and sculptor (d. 2016)
 March 9 – André Courrèges, French fashion designer (d. 2016)
 April 8 – George Fisher, American political cartoonist (d. 2003)
 April 24 – Cordelia Oliver, Scottish journalist, painter and art critic (d. 2009)
 May 3 – Norman Thelwell, English cartoonist (d. 2004)
 May 15 – Richard Avedon, American photographer (d. 2004)
 May 22 – Max Velthuijs, Dutch painter, illustrator and author (d. 2005)
 May 27 – Inge Morath, Austrian photographer (d. 2002)
 May 31 – Ellsworth Kelly, American artist (d. 2015)
 June 3 – June Newton, Australian-born photographer (d. 2021)
 June 24 – Marc Riboud, French photographer (d. 2016)
 July 12 – Paul Jenkins, American abstract expressionist painter (d. 2012)
 June 25 – Sam Francis, American painter and printmaker (d. 1994)
 September 13 – Edouard Boubat, French photographer (d. 1999)
 September 23 – Osuitok Ipeelee, Canadian Inuit sculptor (d. 2005)
 October 7 – Jean-Paul Riopelle, Canadian painter and sculptor (d. 2002)
 October 27 – Roy Lichtenstein, American pop artist (d. 1997)
 October 28 – David Aronson, Lithuanian American painter (d. 2015)
 November 15 – Miriam Schapiro, Canadian American feminist artist (d. 2015)
 December 1 – Morris, Belgian cartoonist (d. 2001)
 December 13 – Antoni Tàpies, Spanish painter (d. 2012)
 date unknown – François Ozenda, French painter (d. 1976)

Deaths
 January 12 – Marc Ferrez, Brazilian photographer (b. 1843)
 January 31 – Eligiusz Niewiadomski, Polish modernist painter, art critic and assassin (b. 1869)
 March 22 – Benjamin Williams Leader, English landscape painter (b. 1831)
 April 15 – Aleksander Sochaczewski, Polish painter (b. 1843)
 April 17 – Jan Kotěra, Czech artist, architect and designer (b. 1871)
 May 29 – Adolf Oberländer, German caricaturist (b. 1845)
 June 15 – Joseph B. Davol, American marine painter (b. 1864)
 June 21 – Edward Clark Potter, American sculptor  (b. 1857)
 August 2/3 – Jacoba van Heemskerck, Dutch painter and graphic artist (b. 1876) (angina)
 August 5 – Candace Wheeler, American designer (b. 1827)
 October 2 – John Wilson Bengough, Canadian cartoonist (b. 1851)
 October 19 – Eleanor Norcross, American painter (b. 1854)
 November 2 – Stevan Aleksić, Serbian painter (b. 1876)
 November 27 – Penleigh Boyd, Australian landscape painter (b. 1890) (car accident)
 December 13 – Théophile Steinlen, Swiss/French painter (b. 1859)
 date unknown – Edwin Romanzo Elmer, American painter (b. 1850)

See also
 1923 in fine arts of the Soviet Union

References

 
Years of the 20th century in art
1920s in art